Malvina is the bride or lover of Oscar in the Ossian cycle of James Macpherson.

Due to the popularity of Macpherson's work, "Malvina" has been used as a given name.

References

Fenian Cycle